Trans-2-enoyl-CoA reductase, mitochondrial is an enzyme that in humans is encoded by the MECR gene.

Structure 
The MECR gene is located on the 1st chromosome, with its specific location being 1p35.3. The gene contains 15 exons. MECR encodes a 21.2 kDa protein that is composed of 189 amino acids; 10 peptides have been observed through mass spectrometry data.

Function 

The mtFAS pathway is essential for producing octanoic acid that is used to synthesize lipoic acid, which is essential for aerobic metabolism. The protein encoded by MECR is an oxidoreductase that catalyzes the last step in mtFAS.

A Purkinje cell specific knock out of the Mecr gene in mice leads to neurodegeneration.

Clinical significance 
Genetic mutations to MECR have been suggested to cause MEPAN Syndrome, a neurometabolic disorder in humans that involves disruptions in the pathway involved in mitochondrial fatty acid synthesis (mtFAS).  MEPAN patients were found to harbor recessive mutations in MECR, and typically present with childhood-onset dystonia, optic atrophy, and basal ganglia signal abnormalities on MRI.

References

Further reading